Sagittaria subulata, the awl-leaf arrowhead, narrow-leaved arrowhead or dwarf sagittaria, is an aquatic plant species that grows primarily in shallow brackish water along the seacoast, in marshes, estuaries, etc. It is native to the Colombia, Venezuela, and every US state along the coast from Massachusetts to Louisiana. It has also been reported as naturalized in Great Britain on just three occasions; only one of these is recent and it appears to have become extinct by 2010. It is also recorded as a non-native on the Azores, and on the Island of Java in Indonesia.

Sagittaria subulata is a perennial herb up to 40 cm tall. Leaves are submersed or floating, narrowly linear to ovate, not lobed. Inflorescence floats on the surface of the water.

Conservation status in the United States
It is listed as special concern in Connecticut, as endangered in Massachusetts, as rare in Pennsylvania, and as historical in Rhode Island.

References

External links
photo of herbarium specimen at Missouri Botanical Garden, collected in Delaware

subulata
Flora of the Eastern United States
Flora of Colombia
Flora of Venezuela
Plants described in 1753
Taxa named by Carl Linnaeus